The Union of Reform Forces of Yugoslavia (abbr. СРСЈ or SRSJ) was a liberal political party in the SFR Yugoslavia led by Ante Marković that opposed the dissolution of Yugoslavia.

History 
The party was short-lived and fairly unsuccessful, but it later served as a basis for liberal parties in Serbia (the Reform Party of Serbia, later Civic Alliance of Serbia and Reformists of Vojvodina) and in North Macedonia (the Reformist Forces of Macedonia-Liberal Party, later the Liberal Party of Macedonia).

In Montenegro, it was the main opposition to the ruling Democratic Party of Socialists, as a coalition formed from the Liberal Alliance of Montenegro, Socialist Party of Montenegro, Social Democratic Party of Reformists, Independent Organization of Communists of Bar and Party of National Equality. It won 17 seats.

In the Federation of Bosnia and Herzegovina it was a basis for the Social Democrats, led by Selim Bešlagić, which merged into Social Democratic Party of Bosnia and Herzegovina. In Republika Srpska it was a basis for the Party of Independent Social Democrats (later Alliance of Independent Social Democrats).

In Slovenia, it was organized under the name Social Democratic Union (Socialdemokratska unija, SDU), but it failed to gain any significant weight in the political spectrum, remaining a small extra-parliamentary party.

Parliamentary elections

Montenegro

Macedonia

Bosnia and Herzegovina

Serbia

References 

1990 establishments in Yugoslavia
1991 disestablishments in Yugoslavia
Anti-fascist organizations
Anti-nationalist parties
Defunct liberal political parties
Defunct political parties in Europe
Defunct social democratic parties
Federalist parties
Liberal parties in Europe
Political parties in Yugoslavia
Social liberal parties
Social democratic parties in Yugoslavia
Pro-European political parties in Yugoslavia